Jednostka Wojskowa AGAT is a specialized light infantry unit of the Polish Armed Forces. A relatively new unit, its name is shortened for “anti-gestapo” in honor of a WWII Polish Home Army Combat Diversion unit. As an advanced infantry unit, its role is comparable to that of the 75th Ranger Regiment.

History
This unit was formed on the basis of the Special Branch of the Military Police in Gliwice, taking over its barracks complex and part the staff, the date of formation of the basic units of the unit was designated for June 30, 2011, so that the unit can from 1 July 2011 begin its role as a functioning unit within the Special Troops Command.

The unit is an airborne formation and is tasked with securing and supporting operations of the Special Forces. The unit is also to carry out offensive tasks aimed at slowing down enemy forces, subversive operations and operations behind enemy lines. In order for the unit to be equal to the best special units in the country and in the world, it participates in exercises with special units of other NATO countries - and most often with US soldiers. In comparison to the other STC units, AGAT is fitted out with heavy weapons such as heavy machine guns and anti-tank rocket launchers.

JW AGAT's members attend Ranger School, but due to financial problems and lack of more free slots in Ranger School, as all trainings and schools connected with SOF are so busy that it is necessary to wait for free slot, even for US military staff, it was reported that the DWS together with JW AGAT were negotiating a deal for the arrival of some rangers, about 8-10 trainers, to Poland to lead the training.

Structure
The unit is made up of three Assault Groups (Polish:Grup Szturmowych) and support elements. It was planned that by the end of 2012 combat capability will be reached by Assault Group "A", subsequent Teams are to have the following deadlines for combat capability - Group "B" initial readiness in 2013 and total in 2015, Group "C" is expected to achieve total combat capability by 2016. Current subunits include:
 HQ Staff and Command Group
 Assault Company A
 Assault Company B
 Assault Company C
 Combat Support Team
 Logistics Security Team
 Medical Security Group

Commanders
Colonel Sławomir Berdychowski (2011 - 13.X.2014)
Colonel Sławomir Drumowicz (13.X.2014 - 8.X.2018)
Colonel Artur Kozłowski (8.X.2018–present)

See also
75th Ranger Regiment - US army equivalent unit
Special Forces Support Group - British army equivalent unit
31st Ranger Battalion - Swedish Army equivalent unit

References

 Jednostka Wojskowa "Agat"
 Special Operations: Polish Rangers

External links

Official website of the Wojska Specjalne